The nineteenth season of the American police procedural television series NCIS premiered on September 20, 2021, on CBS, for the 2021–22 television season, and concluded on May 23, 2022. The season contained 21 episodes.

NCIS revolves around a fictional team of special agents from the Naval Criminal Investigative Service, which conducts criminal investigations involving the United States Navy and Marine Corps. The series stars Mark Harmon, Sean Murray, Wilmer Valderrama, Katrina Law, Brian Dietzen, Diona Reasonover, David McCallum, Rocky Carroll, and Gary Cole. The season is the first with Law and Cole following the departures of Maria Bello and Emily Wickersham during the previous season. Harmon departed the series as a regular after the fourth episode, "Great Wide Open" but still appears in the title sequence for the remainder of the season.

Cast and characters

Main
 Mark Harmon as Leroy Jethro Gibbs, former NCIS Supervisory Special Agent (SSA) of the Major Case Response Team (MCRT) assigned to Washington's Navy Yard 
 Sean Murray as Timothy McGee, NCIS Senior Special Agent, second in command of MCRT
 Wilmer Valderrama as Nick Torres, NCIS Special Agent
 Katrina Law as Jessica Knight, NCIS Special Agent
 Brian Dietzen as Dr. Jimmy Palmer, Chief Medical Examiner for NCIS
 Diona Reasonover as Kasie Hines, Forensic Specialist for NCIS
 David McCallum as Dr. Donald "Ducky" Mallard, NCIS Historian and former Chief Medical Examiner
 Rocky Carroll as Leon Vance, NCIS Director
 Gary Cole as Alden Parker, former FBI Special Agent turned NCIS SSA of the MCRT assigned to Washington's Navy Yard

Recurring
 Pam Dawber as Marcie Warren, investigative journalist
 Joe Spano as Tobias Fornell, Private Detective and former FBI Senior Special Agent
 Jason Wiles as Paul LeMere, former Navy Seal and contract killer who blew up Gibbs' boat
 Valarie Pettiford as Sonia Eberhart, CEO of Sonova Industries arrested for paying Hanover to hire LeMere to kill opponents to her planned copper mine in Alaska
 John Hensley as Phil Hanover, a man who hired LeMere to kill opponents to Sonia Eberhart's proposed Alaskan copper mine 
 Margo Harshman as Delilah Fielding-McGee, DoD Intelligence Analyst and McGee's wife
 Laura San Giacomo as Dr. Grace Confalone, psychotherapist
 Erik Passoja as FBI Deputy Director Wayne Sweeney

Notable guests
 Kelly Stables as Astrid Fellowes
 Patricia Richardson as Judy Fielding, Delilah's mother and McGee's mother-in-law
 Don Swayze as Peter Walker
 Denise Crosby as Hattie Taylor, Secretary of the Navy
 Zane Holtz as Dale Sawyer, NCIS Special Agent
 Meredith Eaton as Carol Wilson, CDC immunologist and friend of Abby, McGee, and Palmer
 Michelle Pierce as Breena Palmer, Jimmy Palmer's deceased wife
 Elle Graper as Victoria Palmer, Jimmy Palmer's daughter
 Naomi Grace as Kayla Vance, Leon Vance's daughter and NCIS Probationary Agent
Kevin Chapman as Billy Doyle, old friend of Parker
Jack McGee as Richard "Rick" Jordan, a grieving father
 Cay Murray (real-life daughter of Sean Murray) as Teagan Fields
Teri Polo as Vivian Kolchak, Alden Parker's ex-wife and DOD paranormal investigator
 Francis Xavier McCarthy as Roman Parker, Alden Parker's father
 Stepfanie Kramer as Sandra Holdren

Crossover
 Vanessa Lachey as Jane Tennant, NCIS Special Agent in Charge
 Jason Antoon as Ernie Malik, NCIS cyber intelligence specialist

Episodes

Crossovers
On January 3, 2022, it was announced that a crossover with the first season of spin-off NCIS: Hawaiʻi would be taking place on March 28, 2022, with Wilmer Valderrama and Katrina Law announcing they were traveling to Hawaii for filming. Showrunners of both series had previously mentioned crossing over and CBS Entertainment President Kelly Kahl had stated that discussion about a crossover would start after NCIS: Hawaiʻi finished its first batch of episodes. Diona Reasonover and Gary Cole also made appearances on the NCIS Hawaiʻi episode of the crossover. The series were previously connected in the thirteenth episode of NCIS: Hawaiʻi when it was revealed that NCIS: Hawaiʻi protagonist Jane Tennant was recruited to NCIS by Leroy Jethro Gibbs. Vanessa Lachey appeared as Tennant in the NCIS episode of the crossover. On April 29, 2022, it was reported that Jason Antoon would be appearing in the nineteenth episode of the season as his NCIS: Hawaiʻi character, Ernie Malik.

Production

Development
On April 15, 2021, it was announced that CBS had renewed NCIS for a nineteenth season. The season is set to bring back the series' typical "Case of the Week" format after having more story arcs during the previous season. Production on the season began in July 2021. Series regular Brian Dietzen wrote an episode of the season. On January 5, 2022, it was reported that production on the season had been suspended for at least a week after a cast or crew member tested positive for COVID-19.

Casting
In February 2021, it was reported by The Hollywood Reporter that series lead Mark Harmon had entered discussions to return for "a handful of episodes" for a nineteenth season after he was told that CBS would end the series if he left. On March 10, 2021, it was announced that Katrina Law had been cast in the final two episodes of the eighteenth season, with the option to be promoted to series regular for the nineteenth season. When the series was renewed, it was reported that Harmon would be returning. On May 26, 2021, it was revealed that Emily Wickersham would be leaving the series after the eighteenth season. Wickersham joins Maria Bello who left earlier in the eighteenth season. On June 16, 2021, Variety reported that Gary Cole was in talks for a major role in the nineteenth season. On June 21, 2021, TVLine reported that Harmon will only appear in a small number of episodes of the season. The following day, it was confirmed that Law and Cole would be series regulars for the nineteenth season. Law started as a series regular in the season premiere, "Blood in the Water", while Cole debuted in the second episode, "Nearly Departed". Joe Spano returned as Tobias Fornell, while Pam Dawber returned as Marcie Warren. On October 11, 2021, it was officially announced that Harmon would be departing the series, with the fourth episode, "Great Wide Open", being his last appearance as a regular. Harmon remains an executive producer and showrunner Steven D. Binder has left the door open for Harmon to appear in the future. In the seventh episode, "Docked", Margo Harshman reprised her role as Delilah Fielding-McGee, while Patricia Richardson guest-starred in the same episode as Judy Fielding. Meredith Eaton also reprised her role as Carol Wilson in an episode of the season.

Marketing and release
On May 19, 2021, it was announced that the series would move from the Tuesday 8:00 PM ET timeslot that it had held for all of its previous seasons to Mondays at 9:00 PM ET, to allow FBI: International to join FBI and FBI: Most Wanted on Tuesdays. The season airs after The Neighborhood and Bob Hearts Abishola and leads into the first season of spin-off NCIS: Hawaiʻi. On July 12, 2021, it was revealed that the season would premiere on September 20, 2021. On September 13, 2021, the promotional poster for the season was released by TVLine.

Ratings

References

2021 American television seasons
2022 American television seasons
NCIS 19